The following lists events in the year 2017 in Nicaragua.

Incumbents
 President: Daniel Ortega 
 Vice President: 
Moises Omar Halleslevens Acevedo (until 10 January)
Rosario Murillo (from 10 January)

Events

Ongoing since 2013 – The Nicaraguan protests

10 January – Rosario Murillo takes over as vice president, succeeding Moises Omar Halleslevens Acevedo.

25 March – Miss Nicaragua 2017

October – Hurricane Nate causes substantial damage.

30 November – The Roman Catholic Diocese of Siuna is established

Deaths

8 June – Miguel d'Escoto Brockmann, diplomat, politician and priest, Foreign Minister of Nicaragua and President of the United Nations General Assembly (b. 1933).

See also
List of years in Nicaragua

References

 
2010s in Nicaragua
Years of the 21st century in Nicaragua
Nicaragua
Nicaragua